Loxostege thrallophilalis is a moth in the family Crambidae. It was described by George Duryea Hulst in 1886. It is found in North America, where it has been recorded from southern British Columbia to northern California, as well as from Montana.

The wingspan is about 24 mm. The forewings are dark rich brown with black lines. The hindwings are brown with a black border.

References

Moths described in 1886
Pyraustinae